Daugavpils apriņķis was a subdivision of the Republic of Latvia and the Latvian SSR. Its administrative centre was Daugavpils.

History 
Established in 1621 as one of the subdivisions of the Inflanty Voivodeship (powiat dyneburski). In 1772, after the First Partition of Poland it became one of uyezds of Polotsk Governorate (1776—1796), later Belarusian Governorate (1796—1802) and Vitebsk Governorate (1802—1917) of the Russian Empire. In 1893, it was renamed to Dvinsky Uyezd (Двинский уезд).

On 31 December 1917 Dvinsky Uyezd, populated by mostly Latvians were transferred to Governorate of Livonia, becoming a part of the Latvian Soviet autonomy of Iskolat and a part of the Latvian Socialist Soviet Republic on 17 December 1918. After signing of the Latvian–Soviet Peace Treaty, Daugavpils apriņķis was incorporated into the Republic of Latvia.

In 1949, Daugavpils apriņķis was merged with Ilūkstes apriņķis and transformed to the Daugavpils District (Daugavpils rajons) of the Latvian SSR.

Demographics
At the time of the Russian Empire Census of 1897, Dvinsky Uyezd had a population of 237,023. Of these, 39.0% spoke Latvian, 20.0% Yiddish, 15.3% Russian, 13.8% Belarusian, 9.1% Polish, 1.8% German, 0.4% Lithuanian, 0.2% Tatar, 0.1% Romani and 0.1% Ukrainian as their native language.

References